Jeanne Boitel (4 January 1904 – 7 August 1987) was a French film actress. She played a role in the Resistance during World War II, using the surname of Mozart.
 She met Jacques Jaujard during her resistance activities in the war, and married him.

After the war, she became a Sociétaire of the Comédie-Française from 1948 to 1973.

Partial filmography

 Un soir, au front (1931) - Marie-Anne Heller
 The Eaglet (1931) - La comtesse Camerata
 Amourous Adventure (1932) - Ève
 Un coup de téléphone (1932) - Germaine
 If You Wish It (1932) - Maryse
 L'affaire de la rue Mouffetard (1932)
 Antoinette (1932) - Antoinette
 Maurin of the Moors (1932) - Madame Labarterie
 Le petit écart (1932) - Jacqueline Heller, sa femme
 Chotard and Company (1933) - Reine Chotard-Collinet
 Ah! Quelle gare! (1933) - Hélène
 Le grillon du foyer (1933)
 Son autre amour (1934) - Hélène
 Casanova (1934) - Anne Roman, Baronne de Meilly-Coulonge
 Famille nombreuse (1934) - Irène de Grange
 Trois pour cent (1934) - Christiane Barbouin
 Whirlpool (1935) - Jeanne Saint-Clair - the Wife
 Les dieux s'amusent (1935) - Alcmène
 Romarin (1937) - Olga
 Les hommes de proie (1937) - Michelle Korany
 Femmes (1937) - Irène
 Ceux de demain (1938) - Denise Vernot
 Le mariage de Véréna (1938) - Véréna Rainer
 Remontons les Champs-Élysées (1938) - Madame de Pompadour
 Petite peste (1939) - Hélène Bertheron
 Une main a frappé (1939) - Simone
 Royal Affairs in Versailles (1954) - Madame de Sevigné
 Napoleon (1955) - Madame de Dino
 If Paris Were Told to Us (1956) - Mme Geoffrin / Sarah Bernhardt
 Marie Antoinette Queen of France (1956) - Mme. Campan
 Bonjour jeunesse (1957) - La mère de Liselette
 Maigret Sets a Trap (1958) - Louise Maigret

References

Bibliography

External links

1904 births
1987 deaths
French stage actresses
French film actresses
Sociétaires of the Comédie-Française
Actresses from Paris
Female resistance members of World War II
Recipients of the Resistance Medal
Officiers of the Légion d'honneur
Female recipients of the Croix de Guerre (France)
French women in World War II
20th-century French women